Hydrozincite, also known as zinc bloom or marionite, is a white carbonate mineral consisting of Zn5(CO3)2(OH)6. It is usually found in massive rather than crystalline form.

It occurs as an oxidation product of zinc ores and as post mine incrustations. It occurs associated with smithsonite, hemimorphite, willemite, cerussite, aurichalcite, calcite and limonite.

It was first described in 1853 for an occurrence in Bad Bleiberg, Carinthia, Austria and named for its chemical content.

References

Mineral galleries data

Carbonate minerals
Zinc minerals
Monoclinic minerals
Minerals in space group 12
Luminescent minerals
Minerals described in 1853